This was the first edition of the tournament.

Alejandro González won the title by defeating Máximo González 7–5, 1–6, 6–3 in the final.

Seeds

Draw

Finals

Top half

Bottom half

References
 Main Draw
 Qualifying Draw

Copa San Juan Gobierno - Singles
2014 Singles